The 50 State quarters (authorized by ) was a series of circulating commemorative quarters released by the United States Mint. Minted from 1999 through 2008, they featured unique designs for each of the 50 US states on the reverse.

The 50 State Quarters Program was started to support a new generation of coin collectors, and it became the most successful numismatic program in US history, with roughly half of the US population collecting the coins, either in a casual manner or as a serious pursuit. The US federal government so far has made additional profits of $3 billion from collectors taking the coins out of circulation.

In 2009, the US Mint began issuing quarters under the 2009 District of Columbia and US Territories Program. The Territories Quarter Program was authorized by the passage of a newer legislative act, . This program features the District of Columbia, Puerto Rico, American Samoa, Guam, the United States Virgin Islands, and the Northern Mariana Islands.

Treasury opposition and congressional enactment 
The program's origins lie with the Citizens Commemorative Coin Advisory Committee (CCCAC), which was appointed by Secretary of Treasury Lloyd Bentsen in December 1993 and chaired by Mint Director Philip N. Diehl. From the first days of the CCCAC, several of its members, led by David Ganz, urged the committee to endorse the 50 States Quarters program. Initially, he found support from only Charles Atherton from the Federal Commission on Fine Arts and Dan Hoffman, a young numismatist from South Carolina who also served on the CCCAC. However by 1995 the CCCAC finally endorsed the idea. The committee then sought the support of Representative Michael Castle (R-Delaware), chairman of the House Banking subcommittee with jurisdiction over the nation's coinage. Castle's initial caution was resolved when Diehl suggested the coins be issued in the order the states entered the Union or ratified the Constitution. Delaware, Castle's home state, was the first state to ratify the Constitution, and would thus get to be the first state to have its quarter released. Castle subsequently held hearings and filed legislation to authorize the program.

Despite the support of the director of the mint and the Treasury Secretary-appointed CCCAC, the Treasury Department opposed the 50 States Quarters Program, as commemorative coinage had come to be identified with abuses and excesses. The Mint's economic models estimated the program would earn the government between $2.6 billion and $5.1 billion in additional seignorage and $110 million in additional numismatic profits.  Diehl and Castle used these profit projections to urge the Treasury's support, but Treasury officials found the projections to lack credibility (at the program's conclusion, the Mint estimated the program had earned $3 billion in additional seignorage and $136.2 million in additional numismatic profits).

Diehl worked with Castle behind the scenes to move legislation forward despite the Treasury's opposition to the program. However, the Treasury suggested to Castle that the department should conduct a study to determine the feasibility of the program. With Diehl's advice, Castle accepted the Treasury's offer, and the agreement was codified in the United States Commemorative Coin Act of 1996. The act also authorized the Secretary to proceed with the 50 States Quarters Program without further congressional action if the results of the feasibility study were favorable.

The Treasury Department engaged the consulting firm Coopers and Lybrand to conduct the study in 1997, which confirmed the Mint's demand, seignorage, and numismatic profit projections for the program. Among other conclusions, the study found that 98 million Americans were likely to save one or more full sets of the quarters (at the program's conclusion, the Mint estimated that 147 million Americans collected the 50 state quarters). Nevertheless, the Treasury Department continued to oppose the program and declined to proceed with it without a congressional mandate to do so.

50 State Quarters Program 
The 50 State quarters were released by the United States Mint every ten weeks, or five each year. They were released in the same order that the states ratified the Constitution or were admitted to the Union.  Each quarter's reverse commemorated one of the 50 states with a design emblematic of its unique history, traditions, and symbols. Certain design elements, such as state flags, images of living persons, and head-and-shoulder images of deceased persons were prohibited.

The authorizing legislation and Mint procedures gave each state a substantial role and considerable discretion in determining the design that would represent their state. The majority of states followed a process by which the governor solicited the state's citizens to submit design concepts and appointed an advisory group to oversee the process. Governors submitted three to five finalist design concepts to the Secretary of the Treasury for approval. Approved designs were returned to the states for selection of a final design.

States usually employed one of two approaches in making this selection. In 33 states, the governor selected the final recommended design, often based on the recommendations of advisory groups and citizens. In the other 17 states, citizens selected the final design through online, telephone, mail, or other public votes. US Mint engravers applied all final design concepts approved by the Treasury Secretary. The media and public attention surrounding this process and the release of each state's quarter was intense and produced significant publicity for the program.

The 50 State Quarters Program was the most popular commemorative coin program in United States history; the United States Mint has estimated that 147 million Americans have collected state quarters and 3.5 million participated in the selection of state quarter designs.

By the end of 2008, all of the original 50 States quarters had been minted and released. The official total, according to the US Mint, was 34,797,600,000 coins. The average mintage was 695,952,000 coins per state, but ranged between Virginia's 1,594,616,000 to Oklahoma's 416,600,000. Demand was stronger for quarters issued early in the program. This was due to weakening economic conditions in later years and the waning of the initial surge of demand when the program was launched. Another factor was the reassertion of the Treasury Department's opposition to the program. When the director's term ended in 2000, the Treasury proceeded to reduce and finally terminate the most effective elements of the Mint's promotional program despite the high return on investment they earned.

Designs

District of Columbia and United States Territories release

Additional notes on individual designs 

Alabama: The Alabama state quarter is the first coin circulated in the US that features Braille writing.
Arizona: The banner reading "Grand Canyon State" in the design is intended to split the quarter into two sections and indicate the Grand Canyon and the Saguaro Cactus are in two different Arizona scenes, as the saguaro cactus is not native to the area near the Grand Canyon.
Connecticut: The Charter Oak on the back of the Connecticut quarter fell during a storm on August 21, 1856.  It also appears on a 1936 half dollar commemorating the 300th anniversary of the state's settlement by Europeans.
Georgia: The outline of the state of Georgia on the quarter appears to have accidentally left out Dade County, which is in the extreme northwestern part of the state. In 1860, Dade residents voted to secede from the United States and from the state of Georgia. The county's secession was never legally recognized, and Dade residents chose to "rejoin" the United States in 1945.
Hawaii: The Hawaii quarter features a rendition of the statue of King Kamehameha I, who united the Hawaiian Islands in 1810, with the state outline and motto. This is the first business strike US coin to feature royalty or a monarch of any kind.
Illinois: The Illinois quarter is the only quarter to directly reference and portray an urban city, with a picture of the Chicago skyline  (the Missouri quarter indirectly references the city of St. Louis with its portrayal of the iconic Gateway Arch).
Indiana: The Indiana quarter—having a problem similar to Georgia's quarter—is missing part of its northwestern corner. Lake County is either partially or completely missing (where it borders with Lake Michigan).  The error did not garner considerable notice.
Iowa: When Iowans were debating the design for its state quarter in 2002, there was a grassroots effort to use a design featuring the Sullivan brothers (to honor the five Waterloo siblings who died when the ship they were aboard—the USS Juneau (CL-52)—sank during the Naval Battle of Guadalcanal, 1942). The effort was ultimately unsuccessful, and a Grant Wood design was used, but not before some copyright issues were resolved.
Maryland: The Maryland Statehouse featured on the coin is the country's largest wooden dome built without nails. Some residents complained that the quarter did not feature the state's famous blue crab.
Mississippi: The magnolia blossom design, while recognizable at the high levels of magnification at which it was presented for review, appears at production scale as an amorphous mass recognizable only when the accompanying state nickname inscription suggests the image's intended content to the viewer.
Missouri: The design contest winner for the Missouri quarter, Paul Jackson, has claimed that the Mint engraver needlessly redesigned Jackson's original submission. The Mint stated that Jackson's design was not coinable, but a private mint later demonstrated that it was. It emerged that Mint engravers may exercise discretion in the final design of US coinage, and the term "design contest" was dropped from solicitations for ideas for later state quarters.
Nebraska: One of the final concepts for the Nebraska quarter was based on the Ponca leader Standing Bear, who, in a suit brought against the federal government, successfully argued that Native Americans were citizens entitled to rights under the US Constitution.
New Hampshire: The Old Man of the Mountain, featured on the back of the New Hampshire quarter, collapsed in 2003.
New Jersey. The first coin in history to ever depict George Washington on both sides. 
Ohio: Astronauts John Glenn, Neil Armstrong, James Lovell, and Judith Resnik were all natives of Ohio, as were the Wright Brothers.
Oregon: Oregon's design features a scene of Crater Lake and Wizard Island.  This design was chosen by the Oregon Commemorative Quarter Commission.  The Quarter Commission was made up of 18 members, including Governor Ted Kulongoski, State Treasurer Randall Edwards, Columbia Sportswear Chairperson Gert Boyle, numismatist Monte Mensing, and Beaverton High School student Laura Davis, along with state legislators Charles Starr, Joan Dukes, Betsy Johnson, and Betsy Close, among others.  The Quarter Commission chose the Crater Lake design from three other finalists: a jumping salmon, the Oregon Trail, and Mount Hood.
Rhode Island: With a mast height of 199 ft (61m) the yacht Reliance could not have sailed under the Claiborne Pell Newport Bridge, which has a clearance below of 188 ft (57m), although the coin doesn't show the ship sailing under the bridge. This would also not have happened because Reliance was sold for scrap in 1913 and the Pell Bridge opened in 1969. 
South Dakota: Although South Dakota has the second highest proportion of Native Americans of any state, the South Dakota quarter features three items that are the result of European settlement. These symbols are Mount Rushmore, which honors four U.S. presidents and is carved into the Black Hills which are seen as sacred by the Lakota, a ring-necked pheasant (an introduced species of Asian origin), and wheat, a Eurasian crop which has replaced much of the state's native grasslands.
Tennessee: There has also been some controversy over the Tennessee quarter. Some sources claim that the details on the instruments depicted on the quarter are inaccurate, such as the number of strings on the guitar and the location of the tubing on the trumpet. The number of strings on the guitar-like instrument would be accurate if the instrument was a Mexican vihuela that influenced the country-and-western music prominent in Nashville culture and business. The instrument, however, has six tuning pegs, so is, in fact, a guitar and not a vihuela.
West Virginia: During the submission process for the design of the West Virginia quarter, there was an apparent movement to put the famous Mothman on the final design.
Wisconsin:A number of the Wisconsin quarters featured a small mint error: the ear of corn features an extra leaf. Some of the affected coins feature a "low leaf", others feature a "high leaf". All of these "error coins" were minted at the Denver mint. It is unclear whether the error was deliberate or accidental, but the error generated considerable initial interest. Sets of the flawed coins once sold on eBay for up to $2,800, although the 2013 edition of R.S. Yeoman's A Guide Book of United States Coins lists considerably lower prices for uncirculated specimens.
Wyoming: Some Wyoming quarters were released in 2007 with indications of improper quality control. Many persons, upon first seeing the same cowboy outline design used on the state's automobile license plates, have mistakenly believed that the lack of detail is itself a flaw, the result of an incomplete striking. However, evidence of cracks in the die and subsequent hasty repairs have been observed in a few circulation specimens.

Year map

Collectible value 

In 1997, Congress passed the 50 States Commemorative Coin Program Act, which instructed the creation of the 50 State quarters series to "honor the unique Federal Republic of 50 States that comprise the United States; and to promote the diffusion of knowledge among the youth of the United States about the individual states, their history and geography, and the rich diversity of the national heritage...", and to encourage "young people and their families to collect memorable tokens of all of the States for the face value of the coins."

While mintage totals of the various designs vary widely—Virginia quarters are almost 20 times as abundant as the Northern Marianas quarters—none of the regular circulating issues are rare enough to become a valuable investment.

There was, however, a measure of collector interest over die errors in the Wisconsin quarter. Some designs from the Denver mint feature corn without a smaller leaf, others feature a small leaf pointing upwards, and still others have the leaf bending down. A set of all three quarters sold on eBay in February 2005 for $300 and initially saw significant increases, such as $1500 for individual coins, but as of February 2020 PCGS lists the value of MS-62 specimens from $92 to $130 each.

Another die cast error ran with the first Delaware quarters. Being the first model of state quarter made, the mint gave it a disproportionate weight causing vending machines to not accept it. The quarter die was quickly fixed. Some Delaware quarters appeared without the last E, now saying, "THE FIRST STAT".

A major error occurred in 2000 when the reverse die of a Sacagawea dollar was combined with the obverse die of a state quarter on dollar-coin planchets to form what is known as a "mule".  As of August 2019, only 19 of these specimens, produced on dollar planchets, are known to have escaped from the Mint.

A 2005 Minnesota double die quarter, as well as a 2005 Minnesota quarter with extra trees (another die error), have both triggered numismatic interest. An unusual die break on some 2005 Kansas quarters created a humpback bison. Relatively more common are Kansas quarters bearing the motto "IN GOD WE RUST."

The United States produces proof coinage in circulating base metal and, since 1992, in separately sold sets with the dimes, quarters, and half-dollars in silver.  For the silver issues, the 1999 set is the most valuable, being the first year of the series and with a relatively small mintage, although prices have significantly decreased since the 50 State Quarters Program ended. The set in base metal, of this or any other year, is worth only a fraction as much.  The silver proof sets of later years, while having some intrinsic and collector worth, are also priced far lower.  The public is cautioned to research prices before buying advertised state quarter year or proof sets.

In general, the program increased interest in quarter and general coin collecting. Large numbers of ads, quarter products and quarter information were available during the years the program ran. Home Shopping Network, Franklin Mint, and Littleton Coin Company were among the most prominent in ad space.

Seigniorage 

Since the 50 State Quarters Program was expected to increase public demand for quarters which would be collected and taken out of circulation, the Mint used economic models to estimate the additional seigniorage the program would produce. These estimates established a range of $2.6 billion to $5.1 billion. (At the end of the program, the Mint estimated the actual increase in seigniorage to be $3 billion.) The Mint also estimated the program would earn $110 million in additional numismatic profits. (The final, post-program estimate was $136.2 million.) The Mint used these estimates to support the proposed program, and the legislation enacting the 50 States Quarters program cited these estimates.

Satire 

On July 25, 2001, The Onion ran a satirical news story titled "Collecting All 50 State Quarters Senior's Only Reason To Remain Alive". On May 4, 2005, it ran a further story titled "U.S. Mint Gears Up To Issue Commemorative County Pennies".
The Late Night with Conan O'Brien television show aired several segments about fictional satirical designs for new state quarters.
Sculptor Daniel Carr, whose designs were used for the New York and Rhode Island state quarters and whose concept was adapted for the Maine state quarter, has created a series of parody quarters making light of the state quarter concept.

See also 

50 State quarter mintage figures
District of Columbia and United States Territories quarters
America the Beautiful quarters
Westward Journey Nickel Series
Presidential dollar coins
American Innovation dollars
United States Bicentennial coinage
German Bundesländer €2 coins
Canadian 125th Anniversary provincial quarters
60th Anniversary of Enforcement of the Local Autonomy Law 500 yen commemorative coins

References

Bibliography

External links 

The 50 State Quarters Program of the United States Mint Official Website
The District of Columbia and United States Territories Program of the United States Mint Official Website
50 States Commemorative Coin Program Act 
State Quarter Designs
The curse of the quarter
State Quarter Mintage
California Quarter Design Project, 2002-2004. California State Library, California History Room.
State Quarter Dollar, Coin Type from United States

Twenty-five-cent coins of the United States
Currencies introduced in 1999
Circulating commemorative coins of the United States
George Washington on United States currency